Buffalo Creek is a stream in Pike County in the U.S. state of Missouri. It is a tributary of the Mississippi River.

Buffalo Creek was so named on account of buffalo in the area.

See also
List of rivers of Missouri

References

Rivers of Pike County, Missouri
Rivers of Missouri